Harper Valley PTA may refer to:

 "Harper Valley PTA", a 1968 country music song written by Tom T. Hall
 Harper Valley PTA (film), a 1978 comedy movie starring Barbara Eden
 Harper Valley PTA (TV series), an early 1980s TV series based on the movie